Trevor J. Rees (October 22, 1913 – January 2, 1999) was an American football player, coach, and college athletics administrator.

Rees was born on October 22, 1913, in Dover, Ohio.  He attended Dover High School, where he succeeded as a multi-sport star athlete, graduating in 1932.  He played college football at Ohio State University from 1933 to 1935.

Rees served as the head football coach at Kent State University from 1946 to 1963, compiling a record of 92–63–5.  His 92 wins are the most of any head coach in the history of the Kent State Golden Flashes football program.  Rees was also the athletic director at Kent State from 1946 to 1956.  He entered the United States Navy in 1942 and worked as an ends coach with the Iowa Pre-Flight Seahawks under Bernie Bierman.  He also established sports programs at four bases in South America during World War II.

He died on January 2, 1999, at his home in Naples, Florida.

Head coaching record

College

References

External links
 

1913 births
1999 deaths
American football ends
Iowa Pre-Flight Seahawks football coaches
Kent State Golden Flashes athletic directors
Kent State Golden Flashes football coaches
Ohio State Buckeyes football coaches
Ohio State Buckeyes football players
High school football coaches in Ohio
United States Navy personnel of World War II
United States Navy officers
People from Dover, Ohio
Coaches of American football from Ohio
Players of American football from Ohio
Military personnel from Ohio